Cyrillic is a Unicode block containing the characters used to write the most widely used languages with a Cyrillic orthography. The core of the block is based on the ISO 8859-5 standard, with additions for minority languages and historic orthographies.

Block

History
The following Unicode-related documents record the purpose and process of defining specific characters in the Cyrillic block:

References 

Unicode blocks
Cyrillic script